is a city located in Hiroshima Prefecture, Japan. The city was founded on March 31, 1954. As of May 2017, the city has an estimated population of 53,616 and a population density of 69 persons per km2. The total area is 778 km2.

On April 1, 2004, Miyoshi absorbed the towns of Kisa, Mirasaka and Miwa, the villages of Funo, Kimita and Sakugi (all from Futami District), and the town of Kōnu (from Kōnu District) to create the new and expanded city of Miyoshi. Futami District was dissolved as a result of this merger.

Geography

Climate
Miyoshi has a humid subtropical climate (Köppen climate classification Cfa) characterized by cool to mild winters and hot, humid summers.

Demographics
Per Japanese census data, the population of Miyoshi in 2020 is 50,681 people. Miyoshi has been conducting censuses since 1950.

References

External links
 

Cities in Hiroshima Prefecture
Populated places established in 1954